Obrestad Lighthouse is a coastal lighthouse located on the north side of the small farming village of Obrestad in Hå municipality, Rogaland county, Norway. The square tower was first lit in 1873 and the tower was rebuilt in its present form in 1950. The lighthouse was automated in 1991 and has been a protected historical building since 2000.

The tower is painted white with a red lantern room on the top. The keeper's house, which was built in 1905, is unpainted stone. The light emits a continuous white light with an intensity of 129,900 candela with a more intense white flash (1,526,000 cd) every 30 seconds. The lighthouse also emits a racon signal: the Morse code letter "O".

The municipal government of Hå purchased the lighthouse station in 2006. There is a museum in the lighthouse and the keeper's house is available for private functions or overnight accommodations.  The site is open to visitors daily from mid-June through mid-August and on Sundays from March through June and August through December.

See also

Lighthouses in Norway
List of lighthouses in Norway

References

Lighthouses completed in 1873
Lighthouses in Rogaland
Hå
Listed lighthouses in Norway
1873 establishments in Norway